Capital punishment in Canada dates back to Canada's earliest history, including its period as a French colony and, after 1763, its time as a British colony. From 1867 to the elimination of the death penalty for murder on July 26, 1976, 1,481 people had been sentenced to death, and 710 had been executed. Of those executed, 697 were men and 13 were women. The only method used in Canada for capital punishment of civilians after the end of the French regime was hanging. The last execution in Canada was the double hanging of Arthur Lucas and Ronald Turpin on December 11, 1962, at Toronto's Don Jail. The military prescribed firing squad as the method of execution until 1999, although no military executions had been carried out since 1945.

The death penalty was de facto abolished in Canada in January 1963 and de jure in September 1999. In 1976, Bill C-48 was enacted, abolishing the death penalty for murder, treason, and piracy. Some service offences under the National Defence Act continued to carry a mandatory death sentence if committed traitorously, although no one had been executed for that since 1945. Canada eliminated the death penalty for these military offences on September 1, 1999.

History

New France

The post of executioner in New France was briefly held by André Bernard in 1645, but was not permanently occupied until 1648, when a military drummer stationed at the French garrison in Ville-Marie, New France was sentenced to death for sodomy by the local Sulpician priests. After an intervention by the Jesuits in Quebec City, the drummer's life was spared on the condition that he accept the position of New France's first permanent executioner. As only the drummer was placed on trial, some historians have suggested that his sexual partner may have been a First Nations man who was not subject to French religious law. The drummer's real name has never been confirmed in historical records, however; in his 2006 book Répression des homosexuels au Québec et en France, historian Patrice Corriveau identified the drummer as "René Huguet dit Tambour", although other historians have challenged this identification as no known historical records place a person of that name in New France any earlier than 1680.

With the role of executioner being unpopular, it was common in New France that a male criminal who had been sentenced to death could have his life spared if he agreed to take the job of executing others, while a female prisoner could have her life spared if the executioner agreed to marry her. Similar cases included Jacques Daigre, who was sentenced to death for theft in 1665 but managed to avoid being executed by agreeing to testify against and execute his associate, and Jean Corolère, who took the job in 1751 and simultaneously saved the life of fellow prisoner Françoise Laurent by marrying her.

British North America
In 1749, Peter Cartcel, a sailor aboard a ship in the Halifax harbour, stabbed Abraham Goodsides to death and wounded two other men. He was brought before a Captain's Court where he was found guilty and sentenced to death. Two days later he was hanged from the yardarm of the vessel as a deterrent to others. This is one of the earliest records of capital punishment in English-speaking Canada. It is difficult to accurately state numbers of capital punishment since there were no systematic efforts to accurately record names, dates, and locations of executions until after 1867, and many records have been lost because of fires, floods, or decay.

Post-Confederation

After Confederation, a revision of the statutes reduced the number of offences punishable by death to three: murder, rape, and treason. In 1868, Parliament also stated that the location of the execution was to be within the confines of the prison instead of public hangings. By the 1870s, the jails had begun to build the gallows  from the ground with a pit underneath instead of the previous high scaffold, the platform of which was level with the prison wall.

Robert Bickerdike was a businessman, politician, and social reformer, who believed the abolition of capital punishment was an imperative and to some extent his life’s mission. Few spoke as loudly or as eloquently as he did for this reform. As a Member of Parliament, in 1914 and again in 1916 he introduced a bill to replace the death penalty with a life sentence. He opposed capital punishment on many grounds, considering it an insult to Christianity and religion in general and a blot on any civilized nation. "There is nothing", he stated in the house, "more degrading to society at large ... than the death penalty." He also spoke of class disparities, pointing out that the punishment was administered to the poor far more often than to the wealthy. He refuted the notion that state-sponsored killing acted as a deterrent to murder and cautioned against the possibility of mistake.

In 1950, an attempt was made to abolish capital punishment. Ross Thatcher, at that time a Cooperative Commonwealth Federation Member of Parliament, moved Bill No. 2 in order to amend the Criminal Code to abolish the death penalty. Thatcher later withdrew it for fear of Bill No. 2 not generating positive discussion and further harming the chances of abolition. In 1956, the Joint Committee of the House and Senate recommended the retention of capital punishment as the mandatory punishment for murder, which opened the door to the possibility of abolition.

In 1961, legislation was introduced to reclassify murder into capital and non-capital murder, later renamed to first degree and second degree murder. A capital murder involved a planned or deliberate murder, murder during violent crimes, or the murder of a police officer or prison guard. Non-capital murder did not carry the death sentence.

Abolition
Following the success of Lester Pearson and the Liberal Party in the 1963 federal election, and through the successive governments of Pierre Trudeau, the federal cabinet commuted all death sentences as a matter of policy. Hence, the de facto abolition of the death penalty in Canada occurred in 1963. On November 30, 1967, Bill C-168 was passed creating a five-year moratorium on the use of the death penalty, except for murders of police and corrections officers. On January 26, 1973, after the expiration of the five-year experiment, the Solicitor General of Canada continued the partial ban on capital punishment, which would eventually lead to the abolition of capital punishment. On July 14, 1976, Bill C-84 was passed by a narrow margin of 130:124 in a free vote, resulting in the abolition of the death penalty for murder, treason, and piracy. It was given royal assent on July 16 and came into force July 26, 1976.

Capital murder was replaced with first degree murder, which carries a mandatory life sentence without eligibility for parole until the person has served 25 years of the sentence.

On June 30, 1987, a bill to restore the death penalty was defeated by the House of Commons in a 148–127 vote, in which Prime Minister Brian Mulroney, Minister of Justice Ray Hnatyshyn, and Minister of External Affairs Joe Clark opposed the bill, whereas Deputy Prime Minister Donald Mazankowski and a majority of Progressive Conservative MPs supported it.

Certain military offences under the National Defence Act (committed by members of the Canadian Armed Forces) continued to carry the death penalty (cowardice, desertion, unlawful surrender, and spying for the enemy), with mandatory death penalty if committed traitorously. Bill C-25 replaced their penalty with life imprisonment, resulting in the de jure abolition of the death penalty when it came into force Sep 1, 1999, although it received royal assent on Dec 10, 1998.

Last executions in Canada 
The last two people executed in Canada were Ronald Turpin, 29, and Arthur Lucas, 54, convicted of separate murders, at 12:02 am on December 11, 1962, at the Don Jail in Toronto.  

The last woman to be hanged in Canada was Marguerite Pitre on January 9, 1953, at Bordeaux Prison in Montreal, for her part in the bombing of Canadian Pacific Air Lines Flight 108.

The last person sentenced to death was Mario Gauthier on May 14, 1976, for the murder of a prison guard in Quebec. He was reprieved when capital punishment was abolished for all common crimes on July 14 the same year.

Military executions
During the First World War, 25 Canadian soldiers were executed. Most were shot for service offences such as desertion and cowardice, but two executions were for murder. For details of these see List of Canadian soldiers executed during World War I.

One Canadian soldier, Pte. Harold Pringle, was executed during the Second World War for murder.

Executioners

John Radclive
John Radclive was Canada's first professional executioner, placed on the federal payroll as a hangman by a Dominion order-in-council in 1892, on the recommendation of the justice minister Sir John Thompson. Radclive is often described as having trained under British hangman William Marwood although there is no documentary proof for this. He can be shown to have hanged at least 69 people in Canada, although his life total was probably much higher. At his death, the Toronto Telegram said he had 150 executions. He died of alcohol-related illness in Toronto on February 26, 1911, at the age of 55.

Arthur Ellis
Arthur Ellis was the pseudonym of "Arthur B. English", a British man who became Canada's official hangman in 1913, after Radclive's death. Ellis worked as a hangman in Canada until the botched execution of Thomasina Sarao in Montreal in 1935, in which she was decapitated. He died in poverty in Montreal in July, 1938, and lies buried in the Mount Royal Cemetery.

The Arthur Ellis Awards—named after this pseudonym—is an annual literary award presented by the Crime Writers of Canada.  Ellis is prominently featured in the 2009 documentary Hangman's Graveyard.

Camille Branchaud
The executioner who worked as Camille Branchaud, a pseudonym, succeeded Ellis. Branchaud was on the Quebec government payroll as a hangman, and executed people elsewhere in the country on a piecework basis. The hangman was traditionally based in Montreal where between 1912 and 1960 the gallows at Bordeaux Prison saw more executions (85) take place than any other correctional facility in Canada.

Branchaud carried out many executions (for which he was not paid) in the postwar period in Canada, such as the double hanging of Leonard Jackson and Steven Suchan of the Boyd Gang at the Don Jail in 1952, and Robert Raymond Cook's execution in Fort Saskatchewan, Alberta, in 1960.

Methods 
The first method of hanging was "hoisting" in which a rope would be thrown over a beam and the convicted person would then be hoisted into the air by others pulling on the rope. The slip knot would then tightly close around the neck until strangulation. A variation of this included the person with a rope around the neck to stand on a cart and then it would be pushed from under him. This led to the development of suspension in which "the drop" caused by jerking something from underneath the offender became the main component of the execution. Executioners experimented with the length of the rope for the drop. They discovered new ways of causing instant unconsciousness and quick death upon hanging. In 1872, the length of a drop extended to nearly five feet which dislocated the neck perfectly. Almost one year later, the length of the drop was extended to seven feet.

The majority of offenders put to death by Canadian civilian authorities were executed by the "long drop" technique of hanging developed in the United Kingdom by William Marwood. This method ensured that the prisoner's neck was broken instantly at the end of the drop, resulting in the prisoner dying of asphyxia while unconscious, which was considered more humane than the slow death by strangulation which often resulted from the previous "short drop" method. The short drop sometimes gave a period of suffering before death finally took place.

Early in his career, John Radclive persuaded several sheriffs in Ontario and Quebec to let him use an alternative method in which the condemned person was jerked into the air. A gallows of this type was used for the execution of Robert Neil at Toronto's Don Jail on February 29, 1888:

The old plan of a "drop" was discarded for a more merciful machine, by which the prisoner is jerked up from a platform on the ground level by a weight of 280 lbs, which is suspended by an independent rope pending the execution … At the words "Forgive us our trespasses," the executioner drove his chisel against the light rope that held the ponderous iron at the other end of the noose, and in an instant the heavy weight fell with a thud, and the pinioned body was jerked into the air and hung dangling between the rough posts of the scaffold.

The hanging of Reginald Birchall in Woodstock, Ont. in November 1890 seems to be the last time a device of this kind was used. Radclive had first been exposed to executions as a Royal Navy seaman helping with shipboard hangings of pirates in the South China Sea, and it is possible he was trying to approximate something similar to hanging a man on a ship's yardarm. After Birchall's hanging, Radclive used the traditional long drop method, as did his successors.

While hanging was a relatively humane method of execution under ideal conditions with an expert executioner, mistakes could and have happened. Condemned prisoners were decapitated by accident at Headingley Jail in Manitoba and Bordeaux Jail in Montreal, and a prisoner at the Don Jail in Toronto hit the floor of the room below and was strangled by the hangman.

Some Canadian jails—such as those in Toronto, Whitby and Ottawa, Ontario; Headingley, Manitoba; and Fort Saskatchewan, Alberta—had permanent indoor execution facilities, but more typically offenders were hanged on a scaffold built for the occasion in the jail yard.

Military prisoners sentenced to death under Canadian Military Law were shot by a firing squad.

Public opinion
Although reintroducing the death penalty in Canada is extremely unlikely, support for capital punishment is similar to its support in the United States, where it is carried out regularly in some states and is on the books in most states and on the federal level. While opposition to the death penalty increased in the 1990s and early 2000s, in recent years, Canadians have merged closer to the US's position; in 2004, only 48 percent of Canadians favoured death for murderers compared to 62 percent in 2010. According to one poll, support for the death penalty in Canada is approximately the same as its support in the United States, at 63 percent in both countries . A 2012 poll by the Toronto Sun found that 66 percent of Canadians favored capital punishment, but only 41 percent would actually support its re-introduction in Canada. A 2020 poll by Research Co. found that 51 percent of Canadians are in favour of reinstating the death penalty for murder in their country. However, almost half of Canadians (47%) select life imprisonment without the possibility of parole over the death penalty (34%) as their preferred punishment in cases of murder.

Since abolition, only two parties were known to have advocated to bringing it back: the  Reform Party of Canada (1988–2000) and the National Advancement Party of Canada (since 2014).

Among the reasons cited for banning capital punishment in Canada were fears about wrongful convictions, concerns about the state taking people's lives, and uncertainty about the death penalty's role as a deterrent for crime. The 1959 conviction of 14-year-old Steven Truscott was a significant impetus (although certainly not the only one) toward the abolition of capital punishment. Truscott was sentenced to death for the murder of a classmate. His sentence was later commuted to a life sentence, and in 2007, he was acquitted of the charges (although the appeal court did not state that he was in fact innocent).

Policy regarding foreign capital punishment 

In the 1990s, Canada extradited a criminal, Charles Ng to the United States, even though he appealed to the authorities, as he did not want to potentially face execution.

The Supreme Court of Canada, in the case United States v. Burns, (2001), determined that Canada should not extradite persons to face trial in other countries for crimes punishable by death unless Canada has received an assurance that the foreign state will not apply the death penalty, essentially overruling Kindler v. Canada (Minister of Justice), (1991). This is similar to the extradition policies of other nations such as Germany, France, the Netherlands, Spain, Italy, the United Kingdom, Israel, Mexico, Colombia and Australia, which also refuse to extradite prisoners who may be condemned to death. Extradition where the death penalty is possible was ruled a violation of the European Convention of Human Rights in the case of Soering v United Kingdom outlawing the practice in member states of the Council of Europe, of which all of the European Union member states are part.

In November 2007, Canada's minority Conservative government reversed a longstanding policy of automatically requesting clemency for Canadian citizens sentenced to capital punishment. The ongoing case of Alberta-born Ronald Allen Smith, who has been on death row in the United States since 1982 after being convicted of murdering two people and who continues to seek calls for clemency from the Canadian government, prompted Canadian Public Safety Minister Stockwell Day to announce the change in policy. Day has stated that each situation should be handled on a case-by-case basis. Smith's case resulted in a sharp divide between the Liberals and the Conservatives, with the Liberals passing a motion declaring that the government "should stand consistently against the death penalty, as a matter of principle, both in Canada and around the world". However, an overwhelming majority of Conservatives supported the change in policy.

In a 2011 interview given to Canadian media, Canadian Prime Minister Stephen Harper affirmed his private support for capital punishment by saying, "I personally think there are times where capital punishment is appropriate."

See also
 Albert Guay
 Canadian Coalition Against the Death Penalty
 List of revoked death sentences in Canada
 Madame le Corbeau

References

External links
 Canada and the Death Penalty (Department of Justice Canada)
 CBC Digital Archives—Death Penalty Debate

 
1759 establishments in Canada
1976 disestablishments in Canada
2003 in law
Human rights abuses in Canada